James Luin "Skip" Rutherford III (born January 28, 1950) is an American non-profit executive and academic administrator. He served as the first president of the Clinton Foundation, and is the Dean of the University of Arkansas Clinton School of Public Service, since 2006.

Early life
James Luin Rutherford III was born on January 28, 1950, in Memphis, Tennessee. He is the only child of James Luin Rutherford Jr (1921-2014), a banker and landowner, and his wife Kathleen Rutherford (née Roberson). Rutherford was brought up in Batesville, Arkansas, and educated at Batesville High School. Rutherford received a bachelor's degree from the University of Arkansas, where he was editor of their student newspaper, The Arkansas Traveler, in 1971-72.

Career
In 1992, he was a key advisor on Bill Clinton's presidential campaign.

In 1997 he became the first president of the Clinton Foundation, and was still heading the board at the end of 2004, when the other directors were Senator David Pryor, Ann Jordan, Terrence McAuliffe, and Cheryl Mills.

In 2006, Rutherford was chairman of the Clinton Foundation, executive vice president of Cranford Johnson Robinson Woods, a communications firm in Little Rock, and a visiting professor at the University of Central Arkansas.

Rutherford has been the Dean of the University of Arkansas Clinton School of Public Service, since April 2006, when he succeeded Senator David Pryor.

Personal life
Rutherford and his wife Billie have three children.

References

External links
 

1950 births
Clinton Foundation people
living people
people from Memphis, Tennessee
University of Arkansas alumni
University of Arkansas faculty